Leif Ericsson (born 20 September 1955) is a Swedish former swimmer. He competed in the men's 200 metre backstroke at the 1976 Summer Olympics.

References

External links
 

1955 births
Living people
Swedish male backstroke swimmers
Olympic swimmers of Sweden
Swimmers at the 1976 Summer Olympics
Sportspeople from Uppsala
20th-century Swedish people